Skylawn Memorial Park is an  cemetery, mausoleum, crematorium, columbarium and funeral home complex in San Mateo, California, directly accessible from State Route 92. Interment records are at 1,308. The park's owners, NorthStar Memorial Group, also operate the Chapel of the Chimes columbarium in Oakland, the Chapel of the Chimes memorial park in Hayward, and Sunset Lawn Chapel of the Chimes in Sacramento.

Notable burials
 Tuineau Alipate (1967–2021), Professional football player
 Wilbur Bestwick (1911–1972), the first Sergeant Major of the Marine Corps
 Bobby Lee Bonds (1946–2003), Major League Baseball right fielder, father of Barry Bonds
 Jim Davenport (1946–2003), Major League Baseball third baseman for the San Francisco Giants
 Samson De Brier (1909–1995), actor and author
 Chub Feeney (1921–1994), baseball executive; president of the National League
 Glenn Morris (1912–1974), winner of the gold medal in the Olympic decathlon in 1936
 Edwin Arnold Panagabko (1934–1979), professional ice hockey player with the National Hockey League

 Glen Hearst Taylor (1904–1984), US Senator from Idaho, the vice presidential candidate on the Progressive Party ticket in the 1948 election
 Willard Lewis Waterman (1914–1995), character actor, played The Great Gildersleeve
 Bill Werle (1920–2010), Major League Baseball pitcher from Oakland

References

External links
 
 

Cemeteries in San Mateo County, California
San Mateo, California